The Lady Eccles Oscar Wilde Collection is a special collection of materials by, about and associated with the novelist and playwright Oscar Wilde, donated to the British Library by Lady Eccles.

External links

 BL page

Archives in the London Borough of Camden
Literature of England
British Library collections
Oscar Wilde